Flying Colours is the fifth studio album by the Canadian rock band Trooper, released in 1979. The album contained the hits "3 Dressed Up as a Nine", "Good Clean Fun" and "Janine", the latter of which became the band's highest charting single in their career history. The album would reach platinum certification in Canada. The album cover design was by James O'Mara and David Sharpe.

Track listing
All songs by McGuire/Smith except where noted.

Side One
1. "3 Dressed Up as a 9" (4:41)
2. "All Day and All of the Night" (Ray Davies) (3:08)
3. "Go Ahead and Sue Me" (4:20)
4. "Quiet Desperation" (Stewart/Underhill/Ludwig) (4:25)
5. "She's So Sweet" (3:35)

Side Two
6. "Mr Big" (Stewart/Underhill/Ludwig) (3:21)
7. "Janine" (4:09)
8. "Back to You" (Ludwig) (4:09)
9. "Good Clean Fun" (4:45)
10. "Drive Away" (3:41)

Band members

 Ra McGuire - vocals
 Brian Smith - guitar, background vocals
 Frank Ludwig - keyboards, vocals
 Tommy Stewart - drums, percussion, background vocals
 Doni Underhill - bass, background vocals

Guest musicians
 Steve Porcaro - [keyboards]
 Steve Lukather - [guitar]
 Joe Lala - [drums]
 Harold Cowart - [bass]
 [Sandra] Rhodes, [Charles] Chalmers & [Donna] Rhodes - [background vocals]

Singles

 "3 Dressed Up As A 9" / "Mr. Big"
 "Janine" / "Live From The Moon"
 "Good Clean Fun" / "(It's Been A) Long Time"

Charts

Weekly charts

Year-end charts

Certifications
In 1979, the album was certified platinum by Music Canada.

References

Trooper (band) albums
1979 albums